Legislative Council Building may refer to:

 Old Supreme Court Building, Hong Kong, the former seat (1985-2011) of the Legislative Council of Hong Kong and now the Court of Final Appeal Building
 Legislative Council Complex, location of the Legislative Council of Hong Kong since 2011

See also
 Legislative council